Andrew Jordan "A. J." Corrado (born January 8, 1992) is a former American professional soccer player who played as a midfielder.

Career

Early career
In high school, Corrado was named the 2010 Indiana High School Gatorade Player of the Year as well as an ESPN Rise First Team All-American after notching 24 goals and 25 assists as his team won the IHSAA State Championship in his senior season.

Corrado started his college soccer in 2010 at Southern Methodist University before transferring to Indiana University in 2011. While at Indiana University, he helped lead the Hoosiers to the 2012 NCAA National Championship with a team-leading 12 assists. That same year Corrado was chosen as a First Team All-Big Ten selection. His Senior year he was named a Capital One Academic All-American and a Senior CLASS Award finalist.

Professional
On January 16, 2014 it was announced that Corrado had been drafted by San Jose Earthquakes of Major League Soccer in the third-round (47th overall) of the 2014 MLS SuperDraft. However, Corrado didn't earn a contract with San Jose.

On April 8, 2014 Corrado signed with NASL club Indy Eleven.

References

External links 
 Indiana player profile

1992 births
Living people
American soccer players
Association football midfielders
Indiana Hoosiers men's soccer players
Indy Eleven players
North American Soccer League players
People from Zionsville, Indiana
San Jose Earthquakes draft picks
SMU Mustangs men's soccer players
Soccer players from Indiana